The Breitenbush River is a tributary of the North Santiam River in western Oregon in the United States. It drains a rugged, forested area of the Cascade Range east of Salem.

It descends from several short forks in the Mount Jefferson Wilderness in the high Cascades of eastern Marion County.  The South Fork Breitenbush River begins at creeks flowing from Bays Lake and Russell Lake within Jefferson Park at approximately elevation  and flows west-northwest, joining with other forks. The North Fork Breitenbush River begins at Breitenbush Lake (mostly on the Warm Springs Reservation) and joins with another fork which passes by Pyramid Lake.  It flows west-northwest and connects with a half dozen other forks and creeks then turns west-southwest abeam Bald Butte.  Several more creeks and Mink Creek and Rapidam Creek join before another fork.

The combined stream flows generally west-southwest through the Willamette National Forest. It joins the North Santiam at Detroit. The lower  of the river cut what is now an arm of Detroit Lake, formed by the Detroit Dam on the North Santiam. During the winter draw down of the reservoir, the original bed of the river is visible in its natural course.

See also
 Breitenbush Hot Springs
 List of rivers of Oregon

References

External links

 USGS statistics report
 USGS gage readings

Cascade Range
Rivers of Oregon
Rivers of Marion County, Oregon
Willamette National Forest